Susan Dimock (April 24, 1847May 7, 1875) was a pioneer in American medicine who received her qualification as a medical doctor from the University of Zurich in 1871 and was subsequently appointed resident physician of the New England Hospital for Women and Children in 1872. The hospital, now known as the Dimock Community Health Center, was renamed in her honor after her death from drowning in 1875.

Dimock was traveling to Europe for pleasure and profession when she died in the shipwreck of the SS Schiller off the coast of the Scilly Isles. She is also remembered for becoming the first woman member of the North Carolina Medical Society.

Childhood
Susan Dimock was born in Washington, North Carolina, the daughter of Henry Dimock and Mary Malvina Dimock (née Owens). The family descended from Thomas Dimock, who emigrated from England to Dorchester, Massachusetts, in 1637 and later resettled in Barnstable, Massachusetts. Susan Dimock was a distant cousin of Ira Dimock (1827–1917), a silk manufacturer, and she was also related to Henry F. Dimock, a New York City attorney associated with the Whitney family business interests. Her father, who was a native of Limington, Maine, was appointed headmaster of Roxbury High School in 1831, although he was entirely self-educated. Later, he moved to North Carolina, where he taught school, studied law, was admitted to the bar, and served as editor of the North State Whig. His wife Mary was also a schoolteacher and supplemented their income by managing a hotel.

After her father died in 1863, Susan Dimock was home schooled by her mother. At the close of the Civil War, she moved with her mother to Sterling, Massachusetts, where she attended a girls' school and undertook an ambitious reading of every medical textbook she could borrow. In the fall of 1865, she taught school at Hopkinton, Massachusetts. 

On January 10, 1866, she entered the New England Hospital for Women and Children, where she began to learn medicine by close observation in the wards and dispensary. Dimock was also permitted to attend clinical rounds at Massachusetts General Hospital, and those of the Eye and Ear Infirmary.

Professional life

When her application to enroll at Harvard Medical School was rejected, Dimock turned to the medical schools of Europe and was admitted to the University of Zurich in Switzerland in 1868. She graduated with high honors in 1871 and her thesis was published that year in Zurich. The last years of her studies, she lived in the family of her friend, Marie Heim-Vögtlin, also a physician, where she felt very happy. 

Despite her somewhat dire financial situation, she decided to go to Vienna with fellow Zurich medical graduate Marie Bokowa for a few months, where among others she met Auguste Forel and C. E. Hoestermann. The four of them called themselves the Wiener Quartett (Vienna quartet) and planned on meeting again in July 1875 in Zurich. After her clinical studies in Vienna and Paris, she returned to the United States.

As the all-male North Carolina Medical Society would only grant her honorary membership, Dimock rejoined the New England Hospital for Women and Children, where she was appointed resident physician on August 20, 1872. She greatly improved and increased the service of the hospital, in the course of which she opened the first graded school of nursing in the United States on September 1, 1872. She worked as a surgeon, developed a private practice in obstetrics and gynecology and performed a number of important surgical operations, a number of which were mentioned in the medical journals of the day.

Death and legacy

Dimock had long wanted to visit Europe once more; when the opportunity to do so came about in May 1875, Dimock and two of her closest friends, Caroline Crane and Elizabeth "Bessie" Greene (daughter of reformer William Batchelder Greene), boarded the iron steamship SS Schiller, bound from New York to Plymouth and Hamburg.  On 7 May 1875, Dimock, Greene, and Crane were among the 336 people who lost their lives when the  hit the Retarrier Ledges off the Isles of Scilly near the Bishop Rock lighthouse in heavy fog. Dimock was 28 years old.

Her gravestone at Forest Hills Cemetery, Boston, reads: "Susan Dimock. Surgeon and physician to the New England Hospital for Women and Children.  Lost in the steamer Schiller on the Scilly rocks.  May 8 , 1875".

"At the time of her death, her loss was considered irreparable, as there were few, if any, among her sex endowed with the skill and qualified by the requisite training to take her place." - The National Cyclopaedia of American Biography, XIX:30 (1926)

In 1939, the North Carolina Department of Conservation and Development erected a historic marker in her honor. In 1996, the original marble gravestone was moved from Boston to St. Peter's Episcopal Church cemetery in Washington, North Carolina, because a group in Boston decided to replace it with a granite replica.

The New England Hospital for Women and Children, where Susan Dimock trained and worked, now bears her name as the Dimock Center, a multiservice agency including Dimock Community Health Center, behavioral health residential programs, and child and family services.

See also
 Sophia Jex-Blake
 Elizabeth Blackwell
 Elizabeth Garrett Anderson
 Linda Richards, America's first trained nurse, trained by Dimock at New England Hospital for Women and Children

References

External links
 Gravestone of Dr. Susan Dimock
 Mass Moments - Dr Susan Dimock begins residency, August 20th 1872
 Susan Dimock M.D.
 1875 Memoir of Susan Dimock reviewed by Cabinet of Art and Medicine.
 Ueber die verschiedenen formen des puerperalfiebers : Nach Beobachtungen in der Züricher Gebäranstalt. Thesis (Dr. med.)--Universität Zürich, 1871. 
  Harvard University. Corporation. Committee on Admitting Women to the Medical School. Report 1867. Mar 23. HUA. Call no HUG 4823.72
 Transactions of the Nineteenth Annual Meeting of the Medical Society of the State of North Carolina, held at New Bern, N.C., May 1872, pp. 10-12
 Memoir of Susan Dimock : resident physician of the New England Hospital for Women and Children. Boston : [Press of J. Wilson], 1875.
 Une victime du naufrage du SCHILLER. Auguste Forel, Gazette de Lausanne, Aug 18 1875, pp. 1-2

1847 births
1875 deaths
University of Zurich alumni
American gynecologists
American expatriates in Switzerland
Women gynaecologists
People from Washington, North Carolina
Deaths due to shipwreck at sea
Physicians from North Carolina
19th-century American women physicians
19th-century American physicians